The Chesapeake Bay Governor's School for Marine Environmental Science (CBGS) is a public regional magnet high school.  Its main building is located in Tappahannock, Virginia, directed by Dr. Rachel Ball.

According to the main site, "The Chesapeake Bay Governor's School for Marine and Environmental Science provides a community of learners the opportunity to explore connections among the environment, math, science, and technology -- developing leaders who possess the research and technical skills, global perspective, and vision needed to address the challenges of a rapidly changing society."

Participating school systems

One of the 18 Virginia Governor's Schools, it draws students from 13 school districts divided among three sites:

Bowling Green Site
Caroline
King George
King William

Glenns Site
Middlesex
King & Queen
Gloucester
Mathews
New Kent

Warsaw Site
Essex
Lancaster
Northumberland
Richmond
Westmoreland
Colonial Beach

Organization
There are three sites linked to the Chesapeake Bay Governor's School: Bowling Green site, located at the Caroline County School Board building; Glenns site, located at Rappahannock Community College's Glenns campus; and Warsaw Site, also located at Rappahannock Community College's Warsaw campus.

The sites generally remain separate, however there are occasional "all-site" days where students from all three sites are able to join collectively to perform an activity, often an educational field trip.

Courses offered
Students take a combination of the following courses:

Sophomore Class
College Biology
Algebra II, Trigonometry and Pre-Calculus
Foundations of Science and ITE115

Junior Class
College Chemistry
Pre-Calculus and Statistics
Marine and Environmental Science I

Senior Class
College Physics
Marine and Environmental Science II
Calculus

All courses meet and/or exceed the Standards of Learning requirements. In addition, students earn dual enrollment credits for each course through Rappahannock Community College.

Community service
To foster community improvement efforts, Governor's School students are encouraged to complete 120 hours of community service by graduation. School clubs frequently participate in neighborhood projects. All community service and credits must be completed by graduation to be recognized and to receive the Community Service Award.

External links
Chesapeake Bay Governor's School Homepage

Magnet schools in Virginia
Public high schools in Virginia
Educational institutions established in 1998
Schools in Essex County, Virginia
1998 establishments in Virginia